

The Dietrich DP.III  was a design for a 1920s German light passenger transport monoplane for six passengers designed by Richard Dietrich and was to be built by the Dietrich-Gobiet Flugzeugwerke as Kassel. Due to the financial problems of the company it is believed that the DP.III was not completed.

Development
The DP.III was a high-wing cantilever monoplane with a conventional tail unit and a fixed tailskid landing gear. It was to be powered by an inline piston engine in the 172 to 194 kW (230-260 hp) range possibly a Benz Bz IV or Rolls-Royce Falcon. It had a crew of two in a semi-open cockpit and accommodation for six passengers in an enclosed cabin.

Specifications

References

Notes

Bibliography

1920s German airliners